This is a list of loughs in County Mayo, Ireland.

 Ballin Lough
 Ballymore Lough
 Bekan Lough
 Lough Beltra
 Bunaveela Lough
 Lough Caheer
 Callow Lough
 Lough Carra
 Carrowmore Lake
 Carrowribly Lough
 Castlebar Lough
 Clogher Lough
 Cloon Lough
 Clough Lough
 Lough Conn
 Cooley Lough
 Corragaun Lough
 Lough Corrib
 Corryloughaphuill Lough
 Cross Lough
 Lough Cullentragh
 Lough Cullin
 Curraghfin Lough
 Lough Dahybaun
 Derry Lough
 Derryhick Lough
 Doo Lough
 Drumleen Lough
 Lough Duncan
 Lough Feeagh
 Lough Fin
 Furnace Lough
 Lough Glenawough
 Glencullin Lough
 Gohery Lough
 Island Lough (seasonal)
 Islandeady Lough
 Keel Lough
 Knappaghbeg Lough
 Knocknagun Lough
 Leam Lough
 Levallinree Lough
 Levally Lough
 Lough Mallarc
 Mannin Lake
 Lough Mask
 Moher Lough
 Lough Muck
 Lough Nacorra
 Nacorralea Lough
 Lough Nadirkmore
 Nageltia Lough
 Lough Naminnoo
 Nanoge Lough
 Lough Roe
 Roonagh Lough
 Tawnyard Lough
 Termocarragh Lake
 Urlaur Lough
 Washpool Lough

See also
 List of loughs in Ireland

References

Loughs
Mayo
Loughs